The Range River is a river of Minnesota. It begins in Low Lake and empties into Basswood Lake 6.4 miles away. It is known to have populations of Northern Pike.

See also
List of rivers of Minnesota

References

External links
Minnesota Watersheds
USGS Hydrologic Unit Map - State of Minnesota (1974)

Rivers of Minnesota